= Three flats =

Three flats may refer to:

- E-flat major, a major musical key with three flats
- C minor, a minor musical key with three flats
- Triplex (building), a house plan with three living units ("flats")
